Liebmann is a surname that may refer to:

 Axel Liebmann (1849–1876), Danish composer
 Barry Liebmann (1953–2017), comedy writer for MAD Magazine
 Charles Liebmann (1837–1928), German-born, American brewer 
 Frederik Michael Liebmann (1813–1856), Danish botanist
 Helen Liebmann, British cellist, member of Penguin Cafe Orchestra
 Henry Liebmann (1836–1915), German-born, American brewer
 Joseph Liebmann (1831–1913), German-born, American brewer 
 Morris Liebmann, after whom the IEEE Morris N. Liebmann Memorial Award (former IRE Morris Liebmann Memorial Prize) is named
 Nanna Liebmann (1849–1935), Danish music educator, music critic, concert promoter and composer
 Otto Liebmann (1840–1912), German philosopher
 Samuel Liebmann (1799–1872), German-born, American brewer 
 Steve Liebmann (born 1944), Australian television presenter

Liebman may refer to:
 Charles Liebman (1934-2003), American-Israeli political scientist
 Dave Liebman (born 1946), saxophonist and flutist
 Jeffrey Liebman (born 1967), professor of public sector economics at Harvard University
 Judith Liebman, American engineer, president of Operations Research Society of America
 Lance Liebman (born 1941), Director of the American Law Institute and law professor at Columbia University
 Marvin Liebman (1923–1997), conservative activist and fundraiser
 Wendy Liebman (born 1961), American stand-up comedian

Arts
 Liebmann (The Strange Summer), a 2016 German film directed by Jules Herrmann

See also
 Leibman
 Leibmann
 Libman
 Lippmann
 Liepmann

Surnames
German-language surnames
Jewish surnames